Antarctolineus is a monotypic genus of worms belonging to the family Lineidae. The only species is Antarctolineus scotti.

The species is found in near Antarctica.

References

Nemerteans